"On Top" is the debut single by Australian recording artist Johnny Ruffo. It was written by Ruffo, Michael Tan, Anthony Egizii and David Musumeci. "On Top" was released digitally on 15 June 2012. The song debuted at number twenty-eight on the ARIA Singles Chart and eventually peaked at number fourteen. It was certified Platinum by the Australian Recording Industry Association (ARIA), denoting shipments of 70,000 copies. The music video was filmed in Sydney and features the iconic city sky line and Australian celebrity chef, model, restaurateur, and cookbook author Sarah Todd.

Track listing
Digital download
"On Top" – 3:39

Personnel
Songwriting – Johnny Ruffo, Michael Tan, Anthony Egizii, David Musumeci
Production – DNA Songs
Mixing – Miles Walker
Additional programming – Michael Tan
Programming and keys – Anthony Egizii
Mastering – Leon Zervos

Source:

Charts and certifications

Weekly charts

Certifications

References

2012 songs
2012 debut singles
Johnny Ruffo songs
Sony Music Australia singles
Songs written by David Musumeci
Songs written by Anthony Egizii
Song recordings produced by DNA Songs